Andreas Giglmayr (born 7 February 1984) is an Austrian triathlete.

At the 2012 Summer Olympics men's triathlon, on Tuesday 7 August, he placed 40th.

References

External links
Andreas Giglmayr at Sports Reference

1984 births
Living people
Austrian male triathletes
Triathletes at the 2012 Summer Olympics
Olympic triathletes of Austria
20th-century Austrian people
21st-century Austrian people